Jack McIntosh Thomson (11 June 1907 – 19 June 1997) was an Australian politician who served as a Country Party member of the Legislative Council of Western Australia from 1950 to 1974, representing South Province.

Thomson was born in Katanning, Western Australia, to Edith Maud (née Jenkinson) and Alexander Thomson. His father was also a member of parliament. Thomson boarded at Guildford Grammar School, Perth, and then followed his father into the building trade, eventually becoming a master builder. He lived in Albany, and served on the Albany Municipal Council from 1945 to 1951. Thomson entered parliament at the 1950 Legislative Council election. He effectively replaced his father in parliament, although a reconstitution meant that they technically represented different constituencies. Thomson was re-elected three times (in 1956, 1962, and 1968), eventually retiring from parliament at the 1974 state election. He served as deputy chairman of committees from 1968 to 1974. Thomson died in Albany in June 1997, aged 90. He had married Catherine Mary Hill in 1937, but had no children.

References

1907 births
1997 deaths
Australian builders
Australian people of English descent
Members of the Western Australian Legislative Council
National Party of Australia members of the Parliament of Western Australia
People from Katanning, Western Australia
Western Australian local councillors